David Lewis (born David Levy; December 14, 1903 – March 13, 1987) was a prominent Hollywood film producer in the 1940s and 1950s, who produced such films as Dark Victory (1939), Arch of Triumph (1948), and Raintree County (1957). He worked for Warner Brothers, Paramount and M-G-M and was elected a vice president of Enterprise Productions, Inc. in 1946.

He was also the longtime romantic partner of director James Whale from 1930 to 1952. Although they were separated at the time of Whale's death in 1957, Lewis later released the contents of Whale's suicide note. Whale was cremated per his request and his ashes were interred in the Columbarium of Memory at Forest Lawn Memorial Park, Glendale. When David Lewis died in 1987, his executor and Whale biographer James Curtis had his ashes interred in a niche across from Whale's.

Lewis was portrayed in the 1998 film Gods and Monsters by David Dukes.

Filmography

Producer

Associate producer

Writer
 Come on Danger!, 1932 (screenplay)
 Sinner's Parade, 1928 (story)

Bibliography 
 James Curtis, James Whale: A New World of Gods and Monsters, Faber & Faber, 1998 
 Boze Hadleigh, Hollywood Gays , Barricade Books,1996
 James Curtis, The creative producer, Scarecrow Press, 1993

References

External links

1903 births
1987 deaths
20th-century American Jews
American film producers
LGBT Jews
LGBT people from Colorado
LGBT producers
People from Trinidad, Colorado
20th-century American businesspeople
Burials at Forest Lawn Memorial Park (Glendale)
20th-century American LGBT people